Henrik Larsen (born 17 May 1966), nicknamed Store Larsen (Big Larsen), is a Danish football manager and former professional player, who played as a midfielder. He was last the manager of Lyngby Boldklub.

He was the joint top scorer at the UEFA Euro 1992 which he won with the Denmark national team. He was also part of the Danish squad at Euro 96 where he played his last national team game. In all, he played 39 national team matches and scored five goals.

Club career 
Larsen was born in Lyngby. He started his career in Denmark for Taarbæk IF and then later Lyngby Boldklub. He won the 1985 Danish Cup trophy with Lyngby, and made his Danish national team debut in February 1989. In April 1990, he agreed a move abroad to play for Italian club Pisa Calcio, who were leading the promotion battle in the secondary Serie B division. Larsen was named Man of the Match, as he won the 1990 Danish Cup with Lyngby, before moving to Italy in June 1990. He joined Pisa in the Serie A championship, but in his first year at the club, Pisa were relegated to the Serie B again. As Serie B regulations only allowed two foreign players in the team, Larsen had to look for playing time elsewhere, when the club preferred Argentinians Diego Simeone and Jose Chamot.

After the Euro 92 tournament, Larsen moved back to Pisa in the Serie B. Simeone had been sold, but following the first few league games for the club, Larsen was put on sale. A number of European clubs were interested in him, but Pisa's pricetag of DKK 50 million kept all interest at bay. Larsen eventually moved to Aston Villa FC in England on a loan deal in January 1993. His stay in Aston Villa was short, as he had trouble forcing his way into the team under manager Ron Atkinson. In March 1993, he was told by Atkinson he wasn't needed, but as Pisa didn't want him back, he stayed at Villa's reserve team until May 1993.

He was loaned out to German club Waldhof Mannheim in the 2. Bundesliga in 1993, where he played well. He returned to Denmark in 1994, to play for Lyngby on a season-long loan deal. Larsen was set free from his Pisa contract in February 1995, when his transfer rights were given to Lyngby. He was called up for the Danish squad for Euro 96, by national manager Møller Nielsen. He took part in all Denmark's three matches, before ending his national team career when Denmark were eliminated. After Euro 96, he moved to league rivals FC Copenhagen, with whom he won the 1997 Danish Cup. He ended his career in 1999.

International career 
Larsen went on a season-long loan deal back in Lyngby, where he helped the club win the 1992 Danish Superliga championship. He was selected for the Danish team to compete at the Euro 92 tournament. He started the tournament as a substitute, but Larsen went on to score three goals at Euro 92, including both goals in the 2–2 semi-final draw against the Netherlands. He scored at his attempt in the ensuing penalty shootout, and played full-time when he and the Danish national team won the final against Germany.

Coaching career 
Following his retirement, he became assistant coach at FC Copenhagen, before managing Ølstykke FC. He was head coach of the Faroe Islands national team until 2005, as well as associated coach of the talent team in Lyngby Boldklub, for whose old boys team he is also playing. In 2006, he was caretaker manager in Holbæk B&I, before signing on with Køge Boldklub in June 2006 and was here coach until June 2008. Larsen was named as the new head coach from Lyngby Boldklub on 15 July 2008 and was then fired after eight months on 30 March 2009. He was the new assistant manager at the Danish football club Randers FC, when the season 2009–10 started, together with another Danish football legend Flemming Povlsen. They were both assistant managers for the Randers FC manager John Faxe Jensen but the trio was fired on 6 October 2009.

Personal life
In 1998, he announced he was marrying an English sports reporter, Sacha Crowther, whom he had met at the UEFA European Championship two years earlier.

Honours

Player
Lyngby Boldklub
Danish Cup: 1984–85, 1989–90
Danish Superliga: 1991–92

Copenhagen
Danish Cup: 1996–97

Denmark
European Championship: 1992

Managerial statistics

References

External links
 
 
 Henrik Larsen Interview

1966 births
Living people
People from Kongens Lyngby
Danish men's footballers
Denmark international footballers
Association football midfielders
Denmark under-21 international footballers
UEFA Euro 1992 players
UEFA Euro 1996 players
UEFA European Championship-winning players
Serie A players
Serie B players
Hellerup IK players
Lyngby Boldklub players
Pisa S.C. players
Aston Villa F.C. players
SV Waldhof Mannheim players
2. Bundesliga players
F.C. Copenhagen players
Danish Superliga players
Danish football managers
Ølstykke FC managers
Faroe Islands national football team managers
Holbæk B&I managers
Køge Boldklub managers
Lyngby Boldklub managers
Danish expatriate men's footballers
Danish expatriate football managers
Danish expatriate sportspeople in Italy
Expatriate footballers in Italy
Danish expatriate sportspeople in Germany
Expatriate footballers in Germany
Danish expatriate sportspeople in England
Expatriate footballers in England
Expatriate football managers in the Faroe Islands
Danish 1st Division managers
Sportspeople from the Capital Region of Denmark